Proupiary is a commune in the Haute-Garonne department in southwestern France. The remains of the Bonnefont Abbey are situated in the commune.

The village is situated close to several popular tourist destinations such as Martres-Tolosane and Cazeres, both of which are within a 19 km radius. Proupiary also offers several attractions and places to visit, including a roman-style basilica in Valcabrere, a castle in Tourtouse, and the picturesque village of Saint-Bertrand-de-Comminges. Additionally, there are several markets in and near Proupiary, including Salies-du-Salat and Carbonne. Visitors can easily organize their trip by booking visits, activities, and car hires using the options provided.

Population

See also
Communes of the Haute-Garonne department

References

Communes of Haute-Garonne